Gerard Sutton may refer to:
 Gerard Sutton (ophthalmologist)
 Gerard Sutton (referee)